Al-Dar al-Kabirah (also spelled Dar al-Kabera) is a town in central Syria, administratively part of the Homs Governorate, forming a northwestern suburb of Homs. Nearby localities include Khirbet al-Sawda to the west and al-Ghantu and Teir Maalah to the northeast. According to the Central Bureau of Statistics (CBS), al-Dar al-Kabirah had a population of 7,280 in the 2004 census. A significant portion of the inhabitants are Turkmens.

References

Populated places in Homs District